Breathe: Into the Shadows is an Indian crime drama thriller streaming television series created and directed by Mayank Sharma and produced by Abundantia Entertainment for Amazon Prime Video. The series stars Abhishek Bachchan, Amit Sadh, and Nithya Menen in lead roles. Season 1 of the series premiered on 10 July 2020. The second season was released on 9 November 2022.

Synopsis 
Dr. Avinash Sabharwal (Bachchan) finds his 6-year-old daughter Siya kidnapped by a masked man. The kidnapper demands that Sabharwal kills a man in order to get his daughter back. The plot revolves around the lengths Avinash will go to save his daughter.

The second season of the series based also on Dr. Avinash/J is released on November 9, 2022 at  Amazon Prime Video.

Cast 
 Abhishek Bachchan as Dr. Avinash Sabharwal/ J
 Amit Sadh as Kabir Sawant
 Nithya Menen as Abha Sabharwal
 Ivana Kaur as Siya Sabharwal
 Shrikant Verma as Jaiprakash
 Saiyami Kher as Shirley 
 Plabita Borthakur as Meghna Verma
 Hrishikesh Joshi as Prakash Kamble
 Shradha Kaul as Zeba Rizvi
 Shruti Bapna as Natasha Garewal
 Resham Shrivardhan as Gayatri Mishra
 Shataf Figar as  Dr. Narang
 Nizhalgal Ravi as Principal Krishnan Moorthy (cameo)
 Gouri Agarwal as Bonnie

Episodes

Production
The series was officially announced in late 2018, attaching Abhishek Bachchan and Saiyami Kher to star and Amit Sadh from the original series returning as Kabir Sawant. Nithya Menen joined the cast in December 2018.

Release 
The Season 1 premiered on 10 July 2020 on Amazon Prime Video. Season 2 is to be released on 9 November 2022.

Reception 
Rohan Nahaar writing for Hindustan Times called the series "Inept and illogical, [and says] Amazon’s strangest show lets Abhishek Bachchan, Amit Sadh down." Shubhra Gupta writing for Indian Express said "Somewhere in there, in all the roiling and toiling, are the bones of a crackerjack thriller. But this loosely written season 2, bouncing in and out of a kidnapping drama, and the creation and search of a psychotic killer, gets mired in its own muddles, and ends up being plain preposterous." Saibal Chatterjee writing for NDTV called the series "low On oxygen", giving it 1.5 of 5.  Saheli Maity writing for Bollywood Bubble called the series "Abhishek Bachchan delivers a ‘killer’ performance, Naveen Kasturia shines in this overstretched drama", giving it 3 stars out of 5.

References

External links
 

2020 Indian television series debuts
Indian drama television series
Amazon Prime Video original programming
Hindi-language television shows
Hindi-language web series
Television shows set in Mumbai
Serial killers in television
Fictional portrayals of police departments in India
Indian crime drama television series
Thriller television series